Calgary-Fish Creek is a provincial electoral district in Alberta, Canada. The district is one of 87 mandated to return a single member to the Legislative Assembly of Alberta using the first past the post method of voting.

The district is largely urban located in the south portion of the city of Calgary. It was named after Fish Creek Provincial Park and was created in the 1979 boundary redistribution from the south halves of the electoral districts of Calgary-Glenmore and Calgary-Egmont.

The district has been represented by only three MLA's since 1979. The first was Progressive Conservative William Payne who served here from 1979 to 1993 and the second is Heather Forsyth who has represented the district since 1993 was first elected under the Progressive Conservative banner but crossed the floor to the Wildrose Alliance in 2010. Forsyth was re-elected in the 2012 provincial election under the Wildrose banner. In 2015, Richard Gotfried was elected, as a Progressive Conservative.

History
The electoral district of Calgary-Fisk Creek was created in the 1979 boundary redistribution from portions of old Calgary-Egmont and Calgary-Glenmore. The 2010 boundary redistribution moved the west boundary to 14th Street into Calgary-Lougheed to keep all of Canyon Meadows in a single district.

Boundary history

Representation history

The electoral district was created in the 1979 boundary redistribution. The first election that year saw Progressive Conservative candidate William Payne win a landslide majority. Payne would almost double his popular vote in the 1982 general election, taking almost 80% of the total vote.

After the election Premier Peter Lougheed appointed Payne as a Minister without portfolio. Payne lost almost 10,000 votes running for his third term in office in the 1986 election. He still won the district with a landslide majority. After the election he was shuffled out of cabinet. He would run for his final election in 1989 and win his fourth term after facing a strong challenge from Liberal candidate Wayne Gillis. Payne retired at dissolution in 1993.

The second representative elected to the district was Heather Forsyth, who was elected in 1993 as Progressive Conservative candidate. She won a comfortable majority over Liberal candidate Marie Cameron to hold the seat for her party. Cameron and Forsyth would face each other in the 1997 general election with Forsyth winning a landslide. She would win her third term in 2001 with an even bigger landslide. After the election Premier Ralph Klein appointed Forsyth to the provincial cabinet as Solicitor General and Minister of Public Security.

Forsyth won her fourth term in the 2004 general election. After the election Klein shuffled her to the Children and Youth Services portfolio which she served until 2006. She won her fifth term in 2008. On January 4, 2010 Forsyth crossed the floor to the Wildrose Alliance. She was re-elected in the 2012 provincial election, and was one of only five Wildrose MLAs who chose not to cross the floor to the governing Progressive Conservatives along with Danielle Smith in 2014. She retired from politics in 2015.

In the 2015 election, Richard Gotfried picked up Calgary-Fish Creek for the Progressive Conservatives, despite a landslide defeat in the rest of the province. He subsequently joined the United Conservative Party when the two right-wing parties merged, and was re-elected in 2019.

Legislature results

1979 general election

1982 general election

1986 general election

1989 general election

1993 general election

1997 general election

2001 general election

2004 general election

2008 general election

2012 general election

2015 general election

2019 general election

Senate nominee results

2004 Senate nominee election district results

Voters had the option of selecting 4 Candidates on the Ballot

2012 Senate nominee election district results

Student Vote results

2012 election

References

External links 
Website of the Legislative Assembly of Alberta

Alberta provincial electoral districts
Politics of Calgary